The Langston Formation is a geologic formation in Idaho and Utah. It preserves fossils dating back to the Cambrian period. The formation is composed of bluish-gray limestone, weathering to a buff color, often with rounded edges.

Blacksmith Fork is the type locality, and includes more fossils than the Idaho sections.

The Langston Formation includes the fossilerous Spence Shale.

Geology

See also

 List of fossiliferous stratigraphic units in Idaho
 Paleontology in Idaho

References

 

Cambrian Idaho
Cambrian geology of Utah
Cambrian southern paleotropical deposits